Ricebird is a name for a number of different birds, especially those that feed on paddy fields or on various grains (not necessarily just rice). Most commonly, it refers to the:

 Bobolink (Dolichonyx oryzivorus)
 Java sparrow (Lonchura oryzivora)
 Mannikins (Lonchura), a genus
 Yellow-breasted bunting (Emberiza aureola)
 Village weaver (Ploceus cucullatus), in English-speaking West African countries